The War in Somalia, also known as the Ethiopian invasion of Somalia or the Ethiopian intervention in the Somali Civil War, was an armed conflict involving largely Ethiopian and Somali Transitional Federal Government (TFG) forces and Somali troops from Puntland versus the Somali Islamist umbrella group, the Islamic Court Union (ICU), and other affiliated militias for control of Somalia. Ethiopia's actions were due to the ICU gaining control of a majority of southern Somalia in late 2006.

Forces involved
Forces involved are difficult to calculate because of many factors, including lack of formal organization or record-keeping, and claims which remained masked by disinformation. Ethiopia, for months leading up to the war, maintained it had only a few hundred advisors in the country, yet independent reports indicated far more troops. According to the BBC, "The United Nations estimated that at least over 9,000 Ethiopian troops may be in the country while the AP suggests the number closer to 12–15,000,

Background

Historic background
Boundary disputes between Somalia and Ethiopia over the Ogaden region date to the 1948 settlement when the land was granted to Ethiopia. Somali disgruntlement with this decision has led to repeated attempts to invade Ethiopia with the hopes of taking control of the Ogaden to create a Greater Somalia. This plan would have reunited the Somali people of the Ethiopian-controlled Ogaden with those living in the Somali Republic. These ethnic and political tensions have caused cross-border clashes over the years.

 1960–1964 Border Dispute
 1977–1978 Ogaden War
 1982 August Border Clash
 1998–2000 Cross-border warfare during the chaotic fraction leader-led era.

Information warfare, disinformation and propaganda 

Even before the beginning of the war, there have been significant assertions and accusations of the use of disinformation and propaganda tactics by various parties to shape the causes and course of the conflict. This includes assertions of falsification of the presence or number of forces involved, exaggeration or minimization of the casualties inflicted or taken, influence or control of media outlets (or shutting them down), and other informational means and media to sway popular support and international opinion.

Eastern African countries and international observers had feared the Ethiopian offensive may lead to a regional war, involving Eritrea, which has a complex relationship with Ethiopia and whom Ethiopia claimed to have been a supporter of the ICU. The Eritrean government repeatedly denied any involvement despite Ethiopian claims to the contrary.

Prelude to the invasion 

Ethiopian troops moved into Somali territory on July 20, 2006.

On October 9, it was reported Ethiopian troops seized Burhakaba. Another article seemed to indicate the Ethiopian control was a troop convoy passing through. Islamists claim the town reverted to their control after the Ethiopians departed. SomaliNet reports the elders asked the TFG to leave to avoid bloodshed in their town. The article said it was TFG troops, and not Ethiopians who had come to the town.

On December 8, 2006, the ICU were attacked by TFG forces, backed up by Ethiopian troops. According to the BBC, ICU Chairman Sharif Sheikh Ahmed called on Somalis to "stand up and defeat the enemies". Another official said Ethiopian troops had shelled the town of Bandiradley. The Deputy Defence Minister of the TFG, Salat Ali Jelle, confirmed the fighting but denied any Ethiopian troops were involved. The Ethiopian government denied repeated claims that its troops were fighting alongside TFG militia.  Witnesses in Dagaari village near Bandiradley said that they saw hundreds of Ethiopian troops and tanks take up positions near the town with militiamen from the northeastern semi-autonomous region of Puntland.

On December 13, a Reuters report said that the ICU claimed 30,000 Ethiopian troops were involved in the invasion of Somalia.

Timeline

Major events

The weak and fragile TFG, that was only capable of controlling small parcels of land far south of Mogadishu, made the unpopular decision to invite Ethiopia to intervene in Somalia.

The Battle of Baidoa began on December 20, 2006, when the TFG's forces allied with occupying Ethiopian forces attacked the ICU.

The Battle of Bandiradley began on December 23, 2006, when Puntland and Ethiopian forces, along with faction leader Abdi Qeybdid, fought ICU militias which were defending Bandiradley. The fighting pushed the Islamists out of Bandiradley and over the border south into Adado district, Galgadud region, by December 25.

By December 24, direct Ethiopian intervention in the conflict in support of the TFG was confirmed by the Ethiopian government.

On 26 December 2006, the United Nations envoy to Somalia urged an end to the fighting, and the President of the United Nations Security Council, proposed a draft statement calling for an immediate cease-fire and the withdrawal of all international forces, specifying Ethiopian troops.  US, Britain, France, and Russia, objected to the statement, saying peace talks and agreement were necessary before troops could withdraw.
ICU chairman Sharif Sheikh Ahmed, told reporters ICU militias were retreating and called on the United States and other countries to speak out against Ethiopia's aggression.

On December 27, 2006, the top leaders of the Islamic Courts Union, including Sheikh Hassan Dahir Aweys, Sheikh Sharif Sheikh Ahmed and Sheikh Abdirahman Janaqow, resigned on 27 December 2006, and the organisation was disbanded.

On December 29 TFG and Ethiopian troops entered Mogadishu unopposed.

As of January 2007, Ethiopia said it would withdraw "within a few weeks"

After the parliament took in 200 officials from the moderate Islamist opposition, ARS leader Sharif Sheikh Ahmed was elected TFG President on January 31, 2009. After this, the Al Shabab radical Islamists accused the new TFG President of accepting the secular transitional government and have continued the civil war since he arrived in Mogadishu at the presidential palace.

In January 2009, Ethiopian troops finally withdrew from Somalia.

Al Shabaab rejected any peace deal and continued to take territories including Baidoa. Another Islamist group, Ahlu Sunna Waljama'a, which is allied to the TFG supported by Ethiopia, continued to attack Al Shabab and take over towns as well.

December 2006 

December 20, 2006: Major fighting broke out around the TFG capital of Baidoa. Thirteen trucks filled with Ethiopian reinforcements were reported en route to the fighting. Leaders of both groups briefly kept an option open for peace talks brokered by the EU. Following the carnage Sheik Hassan Dahir Aweys is reported to have observed that, "Somalia is in a state of war".
December 22, 2006: Nearly 20 Ethiopian tanks headed toward the front line. According to government sources Ethiopia had 20 T-55 tanks and four attack helicopters in Baidoa.
December 23, 2006: Ethiopian tanks and further reinforcements arrived in Daynuunay, 30 kilometres east of Baidoa. Heavy fighting continued in Lidale and Dinsoor.
December 24, 2006: Ethiopia admitted its troops were fighting the Islamists, after stating earlier in the week it had only sent several hundred military advisors to Baidoa. Heavy fighting erupted in border areas, with reports of airstrikes and shelling, including targets near the town of Beledweyne. According to Ethiopian Information Minister Berhan Hailu: "The Ethiopian government has taken self-defensive measures and started counter-attacking the aggressive extremist forces of the Islamic Courts and foreign terrorist groups."

December 25, 2006: Ethiopian and TFG forces captured Beledweyne. Defending Islamist forces fled Beledweyne concurrent to Ethiopian airstrikes against the Mogadishu and Bali-Dogle airports. Heavy fighting was also reported in Burhakaba.

 
December 27, 2006: The leaders of the Islamic Courts Union, including Sheikh Hassan Dahir Aweys, Sheikh Sharif Sheikh Ahmed and Sheikh Abdirahman Janaqow resigned, and the organisation was disbanded. The ICU had evacuated many towns without putting up a fight. The ICU top two commanders, defense chief Yusuf Mohammed Siad Inda'ade and his deputy Abu Mansur were away on the Hajj pilgrimage in Mecca. Ethiopian and TFG forces were en route to Somalia's capital, Mogadishu having captured the strategic town of Jowhar, 90 km north from the capital.
After the Fall of Mogadishu to the Ethiopian and TFG forces on December 28, the Islamists retreated from the Juba River valley.
Heavy artillery fire was reported on December 31 in the Battle of Jilib and the Islamists fled by midnight, leaving Kismayo, without a fight and retreating towards the Kenyan border.
On December 31, 2006, A heavily armed column of government and Ethiopian troops advanced from Mogadishu through Lower Shabelle towards Kismayo. They reached Bulo Marer (Kurtun Warrey district) and were heading to Baravo[21].

2007

Military events in January 2007 focused on the southern section of Somalia, primarily the withdrawal of the Islamists from Kismayo, and their pursuit using Ethiopian airstrikes in Afmadow district concurrent to the Battle of Ras Kamboni. During this battle, the United States launched an airstrike conducted by an AC-130 gunship which they claimed was against suspected Al-Qaeda operatives. A second airstrike was made after the battle later in January 2007.

By the end of March, the fighting intensified in Mogadishu and more than a thousand people, mostly civilians, were killed. Combat deaths numbered 9 Ethiopian soldiers, 6 Somali soldiers, and an unknown number of insurgents. Hawiye clan militiamen  allied with the Islamists  clashed with TFG and Ethiopian troops.

In December 2007, the Ethiopian troops withdrew from the town of Guriel, and the Islamists controlled Guriel after that. Ethiopia had a big military base there to secure the road linking the two countries.

By the end of December 2007 there were over 700,000 internally displaced people and 6,000 civilians had been killed in Mogadishu. The United Nations said it was the worst ever humanitarian crises in Africa. The TFG claimed that the ICU was regrouping, but the Ethiopian Government refuted this claim.

2008

In February 2008, Al Shabaab captured the town of Dinsoor after probing it several times. This marked a change in their strategy which previously focused mainly on the capital Mogadishu.
In late May after capturing the two towns near Kismayo. The Insurgents agreed not to attack Kismayo a city ruled by clan militia.
A new Islamic court was opened in Jowhar, 90 km away from the capital Mogadishu.

On March 3, 2008, the United States launched an air strike on the Somali town of Dhoble. U.S. officials claimed the town was held by Islamic extremists, but gave few details to the press. It was reported that Hassan Turki was in the area. The same area was targeted by US bombers one year earlier. An air strike occurred on May 1 in Dhusamareb. It killed the leader of Al-Shabaab Aden Hashi Eyrow along with another senior commander and several civilians; however, the attack did nothing to slow down the Insurgency.

After long talks in Djibouti over a ceasefire between the TFG and the moderate Islamists of the Alliance for the Reliberation of Somalia, agreement was reached that the parliament would be doubled in size to include 200 representatives of the opposition alliance and 75 representatives of the civil society. A new president and prime minister would be elected by the new parliament, and a commission to look into crimes of war would be established. A new constitution was also agreed to be drafted shortly.

In early December 2008, Ethiopia announced it would withdraw its troops from Somalia shortly, and later announced that it would first help secure the withdrawal of the AMISOM peacekeepers from Burundi and Uganda before withdrawing. The quick withdrawal of the AMISOM peacekeepers was seen as putting additional pressure on the United Nations to provide peacekeeping.

2009

Somali troops on December 31, 2008, were seen by civilians packing up supplies and forwarding troop deployments except in the city of Mogadishu. December 31, 2008 was supposed to be when the Ethiopian troops were to withdraw from Somalia but it appears it will be several weeks after the resignation of President Yusuf earlier in December. With a power vacuum growing, it is unknown who will capitalize on the
situation.

On January 25, 2009, Ethiopian troops completely pulled out of Somalia. 

Al-Shabaab captured Baidoa, where the TFG parliament was based, on January 26. Following the collapse of the TFG, pro-TFG moderate Islamist group Ahlu Sunnah continued to fight Al-Shabaab and captured a few towns.
 
The former chairman of the Islamic Courts Union, moderate Islamist leader Sheikh Sharif Sheikh Ahmed was elected to become the new President of a united Somali government signalling the end of the Transitional Federal Government marked by the resignation of Abdullahi Yusuf Ahmed the previous month and a joint unity government of the ARS-TFG.

President Sharif, 42, promised to "forge peace with east African neighbors, tackle rampant piracy offshore and rein in hardline insurgents". "Analysts said Sharif had a real possibility of reuniting Somalis, given his Islamist roots, the backing of parliament and a feeling in once hostile Western nations that he should now be given a chance to try to stabilize the Horn of Africa nation".

Sharif arrived in Mogadishu as a president for the first time on February 7, 2009. Al-Shabaab and other radical Islamists began firing at the new TFG president hours later. They accused the new President of accepting the secular transitional government.

Mediation had begun between the Islamic Party and the new Transitional Government of Sharif as well as a growing divide being reported in the Al Shabaab organization that controls much of southern Somalia as a large number of Al Shabaab leaders who had held positions in government during the six-month reign of the Islamic Courts Union in 2006 had met behind closed doors with the President of the Transitional Government and the TFG had announced that Sharia law would be implemented in Somalia, but it had not acted on it. Sharif's  forces and African Union troops clashed with the Islamic Party and Al Shabaab forces, leading to at least 23 death. Pro-TFG militias were allegedly being trained by Ethiopia, while the newly formed Islamist Party had been established by Eritrea-based Sheikh Aweys.

Consequences

War crimes allegations
The force of about 3,000 Ethiopian troops faced war crimes allegations by human rights groups. The Transitional Federal Government who invited them were also accused of  human rights abuses and war crimes including murder, rape, assault, and looting by human rights groups

In their December 2008 report 'So much to Fear' Human Rights Watch warned that since the Ethiopians had intervened in 2006 Somalia was facing a humanitarian catastrophe on a scale not witnessed since the early 1990s. They went on to accuse the TFG of terrorising the citizens of Mogadishu and the Ethiopian soldiers for increasing violent criminality.

"Endless war"
A 2010 report published in Accord Issue 21 entitled Endless War states that:
The three years from 2006 to 2008 were catastrophic for Somalis. Military occupation, a violent insurgency, rising jihadism, and massive population displacement has reversed the incremental political and economic progress achieved by the late 1990s in south-central Somalia. With 1.3 million people displaced by fighting since 2006, 3.6 million people in need of emergency food aid, and 60,000 Somalis a year fleeing the country, the people of south-central Somalia face the worst humanitarian crisis since the early 1990s.

Casualties and displacement 
In December 2008, the Elman Peace and Human Rights Organisation said it had verified that 16,210 civilians had been killed and 29,000 wounded since the start of the war in December 2006. In September of that year 1.9 million displaced civilians from homes in Mogadishu alone during the year 2007 had been documented.

Amisom

On 20 February 2007, the United Nations Security Council authorised the African Union to deploy a peacekeeping mission. The aim of the peacekeeping mission was to support a national reconciliation congress in Somalia. The military component consists of troops drawn from Uganda, Burundi, Djibouti, Kenya and Ethiopia who are deployed in six sectors covering south and central Somalia.

Suicide attacks
Islamist fighters in Somalia opened a completely new aspect in the Somali Civil War: suicide attacks. Here is a list of reported attacks:
On June 3, 2007, a truck bomb exploded outside the home of the Somali interim prime minister, Ali Mohamed Ghedi. At least six people were killed and 10 injured – most of them bodyguards.
On February 22, 2009, al-Shabaab carried out a suicide car bomb attack against an African Union military base in Mogadishu, killing at least 11 Burundian peacekeepers.
On December 3, 2009, an Al-Shabaab militant dressed as a woman entered a medical school graduation ceremony and blew himself up killing 23 people including three ministers of the  Transitional Federal Government.

Coalition government
Prime Minister Nur Hassan of the transitional government and Sheikh Sharif Sheikh Ahmed of opposition group Alliance for the Re-liberation of Somalia signed a power sharing deal in Djibouti that was brokered by the United Nations. According to the deal, Ethiopian troops withdrew from Somalia, giving their bases to the transitional government, African Union peacekeepers and moderate Islamist groups led by ARS. Following the Ethiopian withdrawal, the transitional government expanded its parliament to include the opposition and elected Sharif as its new president on January 31, 2009.

Continued occupation 
Despite the Djibouti Agreement there has been a continued occupation of Somalia by the Ethiopian army.

Sharif Sheikh Ahmed continues to campaign for the withdrawal of the occupying Ethiopian forces. In May 2020 the Forum for National Parties which he leads, described the presence of non-AMISOM Ethiopian troops in Somalia as;

A blatant disregard for the longstanding agreement between the Federal Republic of Somalia and the AMISOM troop-contributing countries (TCC), which clearly defines the scope of the African Union peacekeeping mission in our country.

The letter went on to accuse the ENDF of a 'cavalier attitude' in there response to having shot down a civilian plane in Berdale which was carrying medical supplies for assistance in the COVID-19 pandemic. The Forum for National Parties warned that the Ethiopian government's intention was to;

intervene in the upcoming federal parliamentary and presidential elections, and to intimidate opposition groups all across the country

They blamed the Special Representative of the Chairperson of the African Union Commission for Somalia, Ambassador Francisco Madeira, for not only failing to secure the withdrawal of the non-AMISOM Ethiopian troops but having worked in collusion with them to interfere in the South West election in 2018 and Jubaland election in August 2019.

On 13 November 2020 Bloomberg reported that Ethiopia withdrew thousands of troops from Somalia and redeployed them to assist the Ethiopian government in the Tigray conflict.

Continuation of the conflict

Ahlu Sunna 
In February 2011 Ahlu Sunna Waljama'a militias attacked Al Shabaab in central Somalia including killing an Islamist commander. Ahlu Sunna clan militias, reportedly armed by Ethiopia, retook control of Galgaduud's provincial capital Dhusamareb and the trading town of Guriel in fierce battles that killed upwards of 100 people.

Weapons 
The Ethiopian Army was equipped with predominantly Soviet-made weapons while TFG and Islamist weapons vary, having mostly small arms. The following table should not be considered exhaustive.

Key men

Transitional Federal Government (TFG)

An August 24, 2006 article in the Sudan Tribune identified several fraction groups involved with TFG military units:

 Abdullahi Yusuf Ahmed – TFG president, former leader of the SSDF.
 Mohamed Omar Habeeb (Mohamed Dheere) – controlled the Jowhar region with the help of Ethiopia; after losing in Mogadishu as part of the ARPCT, regrouped his militia in Ethiopia and since returned (see Battle of Jowhar).
 Muuse Suudi Yalahow – Controlled Medina District in Mogadishu but was forced to flee by the ICU. Has since returned to the city.
 Hussein Mohamed Farrah – son of late General Mohamed Farrah Aidid.  Although his father was a key anti-U.N. force in the mid-1990s, Farrah is a naturalized U.S. citizen and former U.S. Marine who controlled Villa Somalia. Former leader of the SRRC militia. The Sudan Tribune says Farrah is in the patronage of Ethiopia, and Western interests see him as their best hope to improve Somali-Western relations.
 Abdi Hasan Awale Qeybdiid – former finance minister under Gen. Aidid; arrested in Sweden for war crimes, but later released due to lack of evidence.
 Colonel Hasan Muhammad Nur Shatigadud – affiliated with the Rahanweyn Resistance Army (RRA).  Came to power after his militia (with the help of Ethiopian paramilitary forces) drove out Aidid's militia from Baidoa, which became the seat of the transitional government. Currently TFG Minister of Finance.
 Mohamed Qanyare Afrah – former Security Minister and member of ARPCT
 Barre Aadan Shire "Hiiraale" – leader of the Juba Valley Alliance (JVA); controls Kismayo (and until its loss to the ICU, Marka region).
 Hassan Abdullah Qalaad

Islamic Court Union (ICU)
 Sharif Sheikh Ahmed, ICU chairman and head of the ICU executive committee
 Hassan Dahir Aweys, head of the ICU shura council, former Somali colonel, listed by the U.S. as a terrorist for heading Osama bin Laden-supported Al-Itihaad al-Islamiya in the 1990s.

Islamist leaders
 Hassan Abdullah Hersi al-Turki, led forces which captured Juba Valley, on U.S. terrorist list for taking over the leadership of Aweys' group
 Abu Taha al-Sudan, former Al-Itihaad al-Islamiya, wanted by the U.S. as the financier of the 1998 United States embassy bombings and involvement in the 2002 Mombasa hotel bombing
Saleh Ali Saleh Nabhan, listed as a terrorist by the U.S. for reported involvement in the 2002 Mombasa hotel bombing, said to have been a target of the U.S. AC-130 raid in January 2007
Fazul Abdullah Mohammed, listed as a terrorist by the U.S. for reported involvement in the 1998 U.S. embassy bombings. Some sources claim that he was a target of the U.S. AC-130 raid. His death by the AC-130 raid was later reported by Somali authorities, but denied by US officials.
Aden Hashi Farah "Eyrow", targeted by the U.S. AC-130 raid that killed eight people on January 8, 2007. Was named Al-Qaeda's leader in Somalia in March 2007. He was killed in a U.S. airstrike on May 1, 2008.

See also 

List of wars: 2003–present
2006 timeline of the War in Somalia
2007 timeline of the War in Somalia
2008 timeline of the War in Somalia
2009 timeline of the War in Somalia
Somali Civil War (2009–present)

References

External links
 So Much To Fear

 

2000s in Somalia
2000s conflicts
Wars involving Burundi
Wars involving Ethiopia
Wars involving Ghana
Wars involving Kenya
Wars involving Malawi
Wars involving Nigeria
Wars involving Somalia
Wars involving Uganda
Wars involving the United Kingdom
Wars involving the United States